Someshvara III was a Western Chalukya king (also known as the Kalyani Chalukyas), the son and successor of Vikramaditya VI. He ascended the throne of the Western Chalukya Kingdom in 1126 CE, or 1127 CE.

Someshvara III, the third king in this dynasty named after the Hindu god Shiva made numerous land grants to cause of Shaivism and its monastic scholarship. These monasteries in the Indian peninsula became centers of the study of the Vedas and Hindu philosophies such as the Nyaya school. Someshvara III died in 1138 CE, and succeeded by his son Jagadekamalla.

Someshvara was a noted historian, scholar, and poet. He authored the Sanskrit encyclopedic text Manasollasa touching upon such topics as polity, governance, astronomy, astrology, rhetoric, medicine, food, architecture, painting, poetry, dance and music – making his work a valuable modern source of socio-cultural information of the 11th- and 12th-century India.  He also authored, in Sanskrit, an incomplete biography of his father Vikramaditya VI, called Vikramankabhyudaya. His scholarly pursuits was the reason he held such titles as Sarvadnya-bhupa (lit, "the king who knows everything") and Bhulokamala ("the king who is lord of all living beings").

The Manasollasa

It is an encyclopedic work  in Sanskrit. The treatise deals with a wide range of topics (100 topics), which include the approach to acquire a kingdom, methods of establishing it and royal enjoyment. It contains valuable information regarding Indian art, architecture, cuisine, ornaments, sports, music and dance. It includes recipes for the king's favorite recipes including several types of rice, vegetables, meats and various sweets. In addition to milk based sweets it includes recipes for fried sweets like golamu, pantua and gharika.

The Vikramankabhyudaya
Vikramankabhyudaya, a text found in 1925, is a historical document written by Someshvara III, in the form of a biography of his father. The first chapter provides a detailed description of the geography and people of Karnataka, the second chapter explains the grandeur of Kalyan, the capital city of the Western Chalukya Empire. The long third chapter pertains to the history of the Chalukyas starting with a legendary story ending with the sixteenth year of Someshvara III's  father, Vikramaditya VI reign when the latter began his war of victory, "Digvijaya". However, the last chapter is incomplete as it terminates abruptly as: "The Brahmanas and the ladies on that day...."

References

Bibliography

 Dr. Suryanath U. Kamat (2001). Concise History of Karnataka, MCC, Bangalore (Reprinted 2002). 
 Dr. P. Arundhati (1994). Royal Life in Manasollasa, New Delhi: Sundeep Prakashan, .

Year of birth missing
1138 deaths
Western Chalukya Empire